The  was the German chief military position, in countries occupied by the Wehrmacht which were headed by a civilian administration. The main objective was military security in the area, and command the defense in case of attack or invasion. The  also had a judicial function, as he served as judge in German military courts. He had no control over Army units, but was responsible for defence, and housing for troops. In the occupied territories of the Soviet Union, the Wehrmachtsbefehlshaber was also responsible for securing the occupied territories, protect transport links and recording the crops.

in the occupied areas

Balkan

Following the Invasion of Yugoslavia, the commander of the 12th Army was designated "Commander-in-Chief of the German troops in the Balkans", which was later renamed .

Belgium and Northern France
In Belgium and Northern France, control was originally given to a Military Administration.

Greater Paris

Channel Islands

Denmark
The 's task was to provide military security for Denmark and to prevent hostile landings. The post lasted until the surrender of Germany.

The Netherlands
By order of 17 May 1942, the  received the position and powers of an army commander-in-chief.

Norway
On 25 July 1940, Wilhelm Keitel added a supplement to the Führer Decree of 24 April 1940 on the exercise of governmental powers in Norway, which ordered that the commander of XXI Army Corps should immediately bear the name "".

In order to prepare for the war against the USSR and the subsequent command on the Finnish theater of action, a "Command Center Finland" of the AOK Norway was set up. The Army High Command in Lapland emerged from this command post. On 14 January 1942, it took command of the AOK Norway's forces on the Finnish front. On 22 June 1942, AOK Lapland was renamed 20th Mountain Army.

When the German troops on the Scandinavian Peninsula had to withdraw, there was a reorganization of the command structure. The AOK Norway was dissolved on 18 December 1944; the powers of the  passed to commander of the 20th Mountain Army.

Ostland
The  was responsible for security within the occupied territories (including partisan control), to protect traffic connections and to record the harvest. It was created on 25 July 1941 and was transferred to Kolberg on 10 August 1944 as part of the withdrawal, and was dissolved on September 30, 1944.

Belarus
The  staff was created on 18 April 1944 from the Commanding general of security forces and commanders in the Army Group Rear Area staff. Parts of the staff were used in July 1944 for the formation of the Rothkirch General Command, which was reclassified as General Command LIII Army Corps on 13 November 1944.

Ukraine

Sardinia and Corsica

WB Korsika was formed in September 1943 in direct succession to  when the latter HQ was renamed officially for the last time. With the evacuation of Sardinia in September already and the evacuation of Corsica on 3 October 1943 (entirely finished on 5 October) finally, the staff ceased to exist.

Notes

References

Bibliography
Print

 
 
 
 
 
 
 
 
 
 
 
 
 
 
 
 
 
 
 

Online

External links
War diary of the Commander-in-chief of the German Army in Denmark, 1943-1945 (in German)

Military units and formations established in 1940
Wehrmacht
1940 establishments in Germany
German High Command during World War II